Sydney University Speleological Society (SUSS) is a caving group based in Sydney, Australia, which aims to unite University of Sydney graduates, undergraduates, staff and all other people who are interested in the exploration and mapping of cave systems. The society fosters speleology as a science and sport and co-operates with other bodies in the furtherance of these aims.
SUSS was founded in 1948 and is the oldest caving group on mainland Australia (and second-oldest in the country, having formed two years after the Tasmanian Caverneering Club). It has been heavily involved in the exploration and mapping of various Australian cave systems since its formation.
The society pioneered the sport of cave diving in Australia and was a founding member of the Australian Speleological Federation.

History 
The Sydney University Speleological Society was formed in 1948  as a splinter group of the Sydney University Bushwalking club with Jak Kelly as its inaugural president. The society is the oldest caving group in mainland Australia and was involved the early exploration and documentation of many caving areas in New South Wales.

The society has spent significant amounts of time exploring Jenolan caves to the west of Sydney having published two books on the area. It was also involved in the discovery of many major additions including Spider cave, Wiburds lake cave, and the diving of Imperial cave.

Publications 
The Sydney University Speleological Society has published several books on Australian caves and caving, including:
 The Exploration and Speleogeography of Mammoth Cave, Jenolan 
 The Caves of Jenolan 2: The Northern Limestone 
 Tuglow Caves

The Society also publishes a regular Bulletin.

Notable Members 
 Jak Kelly
 Al Warild
 Ron Allum
 David Apperly

External links
Official site

References

Caving organizations
Clubs and societies in Australia
Sporting clubs in Sydney
1948 establishments in Australia
University of Sydney